Tinklenberg is a surname. Notable people with the surname include:

 Elwyn Tinklenberg (born 1950), American politician
 Jared Tinklenberg (born 1939), American psychiatrist
 Karla Jurvetson (née Tinklenberg, born 1965/66), American psychiatrist, philanthropist, and political organizer